Oathbringer is an epic fantasy novel written by American author Brandon Sanderson and the third book in The Stormlight Archive series. It was published by Tor Books on November 14, 2017. Oathbringer consists of one prologue, 122 chapters, 14 interludes and an epilogue. It is preceded by Words of Radiance and followed by Rhythm of War.

As with its Stormlight Archive predecessors, the unabridged audiobook is read by narrator team Michael Kramer and Kate Reading.

Development
The third book was initially titled Stones Unhallowed with Szeth-son-son-Vallano as its focus, then Skybreaker, and eventually Oathbringer with the focus on Dalinar Kholin.

Prior to the release of Oathbringer, several chapters and interludes had been posted in blog posts, read in conventions and published in an anthology. Sanderson provided numerous updates on Reddit about his progress on the book. On December 9, 2016, three weeks after his fifth update, Tor announced that Sanderson had completed his first draft, coming in at 461,223 words. On March 15, 2017, Sanderson completed the third of five planned drafts, which totaled 514,000 words. On June 15, 2017, Sanderson completed the fifth and final draft and managed to cut it down to 450,000 words. On June 27, 2017, Tor posted a blog post detailing the process of beta reading for Oathbringer in which beta readers give their immediate reactions to any given point in the story and look for continuity. Due to the length of the book, Tor had to use a different press and bindery from the one that printed Words of Radiance.

After realizing the book took more time to work on than originally planned, Sanderson wrote a novella titled Edgedancer, following Lift; first published in Arcanum Unbounded: The Cosmere Collection, an anthology of Cosmere short fiction, on November 22, 2016.

On March 16, 2017, Tor Books revealed the cover art for Oathbringer, painted by Michael Whelan. It shows Jasnah Kholin defending a city against an invasion. She reaches for a Shardblade while simultaneously soulcasting a large hole in the city wall made by a thunderclast. Three days later, Tor posted a blog post that discussed details of the cover and how it may relate to the book's plot. On July 14, 2017, Sanderson revealed the UK cover of Oathbringer on Twitter.

The hardcover version of the novel was published with endpapers which depict 4 of the ten heralds, two created by each artist Howard Lyon and Dan dos Santos. Reviewer Frannie Jackson described the art as "gorgeous."

On August 2, 2017, Tor Books revealed the dates and locations for the Oathbringer book tour. Tor.com released the prologue on August 22; and the first 32 chapters, three weekly, from August 29 to November 7.

Audiobook
The audiobook version of the book was released on the same day as the hardcover version, and is read by narrator team Michael Kramer and Kate Reading, who also read The Way of Kings and Words of Radiance, and several other books written by Sanderson.

Sequel
The fourth book in The Stormlight Archive series is titled Rhythm of War and its publication date was November 17, 2020. It takes place a year after the events of Oathbringer.

Reception 
Reception of the series was mostly positive. The A.V. Club reviewer Samantha Nelson describes the novel as both weighed down by its ambition and less complex than its predecessors. While reviews on Tor find the novel engaging, with Martin Cahill writing that "It is a triumph of a novel, and if you’ve enjoyed the first two, you’ll certainly enjoy Oathbringer." Publishers Weekly also described the novel in light of its relationship to other books in the series, writing, "Sanderson successfully balances introducing new elements and satisfactorily resolving some threads, leaving fans to eagerly await the next in the series." The review in Paste by Frannie Jackson compares the novel to the long-arc storytelling of Robert Jordan, describing the novel as "brimming with more than enough magic and mystery to tide readers over until the [fourth novel is published]."

References

External links
 Oathbringer on Brandon Sanderson's official website

2017 American novels
The Stormlight Archive
Tor Books books
Books with cover art by Michael Whelan
Novels set on fictional planets